Zipporah Potter Atkins (July 4, 1645January 8, 1705) was a free African American woman who owned land in colonial Boston, during a time when few women or African Americans owned land in the American Colonies. The purchase of her home, dated 1670, makes her the first African American to own land in the city of Boston, and with Anthony Johnson one of the earliest African-American landowners in what would become the United States.

Biography 
Zipporah Potter was born to Richard and Grace, slaves of Captain Robert Keayne, in the Massachusetts Bay Colony in the mid-1600s. Children born to slaves in Boston at that time were considered free upon birth, explaining Zipporah's status as a free African American in Colonial Boston. Taking the surname of Atkins upon marriage, Zipporah is reported to have had six surnames in total. Her marriage was reportedly officiated by the prominent Puritan minister Cotton Mather. After her death, Atkins was laid to rest in Copp's Hill Burying Ground at an unknown location.

Pioneering landowner 
According to historical records, Zipporah Potter Atkins was able to purchase her property through an inheritance she received from her father. Her property was situated on the edge of Boston's North End, near a mill pond which flowed into Boston Harbor. She owned her property while a single woman, managing to maintain control of her land through the course of her marriage. As she owned her property between the years 1670 and 1699, Atkins was the first recorded African American to own land in Boston. She also learned to read well enough to at least sign her initials, during a time when many people could not read. When she signed the deed to sell her home in 1699, she became the first African American woman to initial a deed in Suffolk County, Massachusetts.

Legacy 
Dr. Vivian Johnson, a retired professor of education at Boston University, discovered documentation of Zipporah's property records around 2009. Following years of research on the part of Dr. Johnson, then-Governor Deval Patrick unveiled a memorial to Zipporah Potter Atkins on the Rose Fitzgerald Kennedy Greenway. Dr. Johnson held a talk titled "Free, Black and Female: The Zipporah Potter Atkins Story of Homeownership in Colonial Boston" at the  Museum of African American History in Boston in May 2014.

References

1645 births
1705 deaths
People from colonial Boston
Boston
African-American history in Boston
Burials in Boston
17th-century American slaves
18th-century American slaves
17th-century landowners
17th-century African-American women
17th-century African-American people